You, Me and Him is a 2017 British romantic comedy film written and directed by Daisy Aitkens.  Its early title was Fish Without Bicycles.

The film focuses on the relationships between a lesbian couple, Olivia (Lucy Punch) and Alex (Faye Marsay), and their womanizing neighbour John (David Tennant).

Cast 
Lucy Punch as Olivia
Faye Marsay as Alex
David Tennant as John
Gemma Jones as Sue Miller
David Warner as Michael Miller
Sarah Parish as Mrs Jones
Sally Philips as Amy
Simon Bird as Ben Miller
Nina Sosanya as Dr Parks

Plot
Set in middle class England, with female lovers Olivia and Alex.  Olivia is a career lawyer in her 40s, feels ready to start a family but Alex, a much younger artist, remains unsure. When Olivia reveals that she has already begun fertility treatment and insemination, the couple have an argument. Alex has an encounter with John and wakes up in his bed.  When the two women discover that they are each pregnant, the three people's relationships enter complicated and uncharted territory.

References

External links

2017 films
2010s English-language films
2017 LGBT-related films
British LGBT-related films
2010s British films
Lesbian-related films